Paint the Town is the third studio album by American country music band Highway 101. The last of their albums featuring Paulette Carlson as lead vocalist, it included the Billboard Country #1 "Who's Lonely Now," the #4 "Walkin', Talkin', Cryin', Barely Beatin' Broken Heart," and the #11 "This Side of Goodbye." Also included on the album is a cover of James Taylor's "Sweet Baby James". "Rough and Tumble Heart" was later recorded by Pam Tillis on her 1992 album Homeward Looking Angel.

Track listing

Personnel

Highway 101
Paulette Carlson - lead vocals, acoustic guitar
Jack Daniels - background vocals, electric guitar, acoustic guitar, six string bass
Cactus Moser - background vocals, drums, acoustic guitar
Curtis Stone - background vocals, four string bass, harmonica

Additional Musicians
Dennis Burnside - Piano
Larry Byrom - Acoustic guitar, Electric guitar
Sharon Eaves - Background Vocals
Steve Fishell - Steel guitar
John Hobbs - Piano
John Barlow Jarvis - Piano
Greg Leisz - Steel guitar
Mike Poole - Percussion
Harry Stinson - Background Vocals
Dennis Wilson - Background Vocals
Curtis Young - Background Vocals

Charts

Weekly charts

Year-end charts

Singles

References

1989 albums
Highway 101 albums
Albums produced by Paul Worley
Warner Records albums